The Book Club (formerly First Tuesday Book Club) was an Australian television show that discussed books, ostensibly in the style of a domestic book club. Hosted by journalist Jennifer Byrne, it used a panel format with two regular members – book reviewer Jason Steger and author/blogger Marieke Hardy – and two guest members. The show first aired on ABC on 1 August 2006 and was scheduled as a monthly program. The show concluded in 2017.

Books reviewed

2006 
 American Psycho by Bret Easton Ellis – August 2006
The Ballad of Desmond Kale by Roger McDonald – August 2006
 The Shadow of the Wind by Carlos Ruiz Zafón – September 2006
 Longitude: The True Story of a Lone Genius Who Solved the Greatest Scientific Problem of His Time by Dava Sobel – September 2006
 The Life and Times of the Thunderbolt Kid by Bill Bryson – October 2006
 The Rachel Papers by Martin Amis – October 2006
 The Mission Song by John le Carré – November 2006
 The Transit of Venus by Shirley Hazzard – November 2006
 The Unknown Terrorist by Richard Flanagan – December 2006
 The God Delusion by Richard Dawkins – December 2006

2007 
 Mister Pip by Lloyd Jones – March 2007
 The Solid Mandala by Patrick White – March 2007
 In the Company of the Courtesan by Sarah Dunant – April 2007
 The Secret River by Kate Grenville – April 2007
 The Road by Cormac McCarthy – May 2007
 Slaughterhouse-Five by Kurt Vonnegut – May 2007
 The Raw Shark Texts by Steven Hall – June 2007
 Alice's Adventures in Wonderland by Lewis Carroll – June 2007
 The Post-Birthday World by Lionel Shriver – July 2007
 Le Grand Meaulnes by Alain-Fournier – July 2007
 A Thousand Splendid Suns by Khaled Hosseini – August 2007
 The Dancer Upstairs by Nicholas Shakespeare – August 2007
 The Broken Shore by Peter Temple – September 2007
 The Memory of Running by Ron McLarty – September 2007
 Moby-Dick by Herman Melville – October 2007
 East of Time by Jacob G. Rosenberg – October 1997
 On Chesil Beach by Ian McEwan – November 2007
 The Big Sleep by Raymond Chandler – November 2007
 Not in the Flesh by Ruth Rendell – December 2007
 The Children by Charlotte Wood – December 2007

2008 
 The Memory Room by Christopher Koch – March 2008
 Naked by David Sedaris – March 2008
 Liar's Poker by Michael Lewis – April 2008
 People of the Book by Geraldine Brooks – April 2008
 The Girl with the Dragon Tattoo by Stieg Larsson – May 2008
 A Farewell to Arms by Ernest Hemingway – May 2008
 Breath by Tim Winton – June 2008
 Demons at Dusk by Peter Stewart – June 2008
 Peter Pan by J. M. Barrie – July 2008
 Miracles of Life by J. G. Ballard – July 2008
 Devil May Care by Sebastian Faulks – August 2008
 The Adventures of Augie March by Saul Bellow – August 2008
 Disquiet by Julia Leigh – September 2008
 A Confederacy of Dunces by John Kennedy Toole – September 2008
 The Lonely Passion of Judith Hearne by Brian Moore – October 2008
 Pandora in the Congo by Albert Sánchez Piñol – October 2008
 The Outsider by Albert Camus – November 2008
 Something to Tell You by Hanif Kureishi – November 2008
 The Guernsey Literary and Potato Peel Pie Society by Mary Ann Shaffer – December 2008

2009 
 The Grapes of Wrath by John Steinbeck – March 2009
 The White Tiger by Aravind Adiga – March 2009
 Revolutionary Road by Richard Yates – April 2009
 The Private Patient by P. D. James – April 2009
 The Slap by Christos Tsiolkas – May 2009
 Darwin and the Barnacle by Rebecca Stott – May 2009
 The Great Gatsby by F. Scott Fitzgerald – June 2009
 Ransom by David Malouf – June 2009
 The Housekeeper + the Professor by Yōko Ogawa – July 2009
 The Collector by John Fowles – July 2009
 Gone Tomorrow by Lee Child – August 2009
 Middlesex by Jeffrey Eugenides – August 2009
 The Leopard by Giuseppe Tomasi di Lampedusa – September 2009
 Jeff in Venice, Death in Varanasi by Geoff Dyer – September 2009
 The Little Stranger by Sarah Waters – October 2009
 Ask the Dust by John Fante – October 2009
 This is How by M. J. Hyland – November 2009
 The Prime of Miss Jean Brodie by Muriel Spark – November 2009
 Ordinary Thunderstorms by William Boyd – December 2009
 Summer Reads – December 2009

2010 
 Cloudstreet by Tim Winton – March 2010
 Zeitoun by Dave Eggers – March 2010
 Solar by Ian McEwan – April 2010
 Strange Case of Dr Jekyll and Mr Hyde by Robert Louis Stevenson – April 2010
 Wide Sargasso Sea by Jean Rhys – May 2010
 The Museum of Innocence by Orhan Pamuk – May 2010
 Pride and Prejudice by Jane Austen – June 2010
 Reading by Moonlight by Brenda Walker – June 2010
 One Day by David Nichols – July 2010
 Portnoy's Complaint by Philip Roth – July 2010
 Anna Karenina by Leo Tolstoy – August 2010
 Beatrice and Virgil by Yann Martel – August 2010
 To Kill a Mockingbird by Harper Lee – September 2010
 Inheritance by Nicholas Shakespeare – September 2010
 Indelible Ink by Fiona McGregor – October 2010
 The Catcher in the Rye by J. D. Salinger – October 2010
 Atlas Shrugged by Ayn Rand – November 2010
 Freedom by Jonathan Franzen – November 2010
 Parrot and Olivier in America by Peter Carey – December 2010
 Dead Man's Chest by Kerry Greenwood – December 2010

2011
March 2011
 Madame Bovary by Gustave Flaubert 
 Our Kind of Traitor by John le Carré
April 2011 
 Super Sad True Love Story by Gary Shteyngart 
 The Man Who Loved Children by Christina Stead
May 2011
 Blood Meridian by Cormac McCarthy 
 Me and Mr Booker by Corey Taylor
June 2011
 Women in Love by D. H. Lawrence
 The Happy Life by David Malouf
July 2011
 The Last Werewolf by Glen Duncan
 Cold Comfort Farm by Stella Gibbons
August 2011
 The Master and Margarita by Mikhail Bulgakov
 Past The Shallows by Favel Parrett
September 2011
 Cloud Atlas by David Mitchell 
 Kinglake 350 by Adrian Hyland
October 2011
 The Hare with Amber Eyes by Edmund de Waal
 Rebecca by Daphne du Maurier
November 2011
The Happy Prince by Oscar Wilde
A Visit from the Goon Squad' by Jennifer Egan
December 2011
Summer Special 2012How I Became A Famous Novelist by Steve Hely

2012
March 2012Great Expectations by Charles DickensThe Submission by Amy Waldman

April 2012Nineteen Eighty-Four by George OrwellWhy Be Happy When You Could Be Normal? by Jeanette Winterson

May 2012The Light Between Oceans by M.L StedmanThe Silence of the Lambs by Thomas Harris

June 2012The Ghost Writer by Philip RothThe Riddle of the Sands by Erskine Childers

July 2012The Cook by Wayne MacauleyCrossing to Safety by Wallace Stegner

August 2012The Age of Miracles by Karen Thompson WalkerThe Sea, the Sea'' by Iris Murdoch

Guests 
Guests have included Jesuit priest Frank Brennan, actress Penny Cook, gardener Peter Cundall, Sex Discrimination Commissioner Pru Goward, feminist Germaine Greer, author Di Morrissey, enfant-terrible John Safran, musician and broadcaster Lindsay "The Doctor" Mc Dougall, politician Malcolm Turnbull, retired NSW Premier Bob Carr, comedian Judith Lucy, movie critic Bill Collins, retired Australian General (and author) Peter Cosgrove, and actor/writer/director Richard E Grant.

See also 
 Jennifer Byrne Presents
 List of Australian television series
 The Book Group – British comedy

References

External links 
 

Australian television talk shows
Television shows about books and literature
Australian Broadcasting Corporation original programming
2006 Australian television series debuts